Grivița is the Romanian exonym of Grivitsa, a Bulgarian village that was the site of a battle during the Siege of Plevna in the Romanian War of Independence.

Grivița may refer to:

Places
Grivița, an area of the city Bucharest
Grivița strike of 1933
Grivița metro station
Grivița, Galați, a commune in Galați County
Grivița, Ialomița, a commune in Ialomița County
Grivița, Vaslui, a commune in Vaslui County
 Grivița, a village in Cordăreni Commune, Botoșani County

Other uses
 Grivița (vehicle manufacturer)
 NMS Grivița